The Men's 5000 metres event at the 2013 European Athletics U23 Championships was held in Tampere, Finland, at Ratina Stadium on 13 July.

Medalists

Results

Final
13 July 2013 

Intermediate times:
1000m: 2:52.22 Gabriel Navarro 
2000m: 6:01.92 Aitor Fernández 
3000m: 9:00.80 Gabriel Navarro 
4000m: 11:49.11 Thomas Farrell

Participation
According to an unofficial count, 15 athletes from 13 countries participated in the event.

References

5000 metres
5000 metres at the European Athletics U23 Championships